Andrew John Branigan (April 11, 1922 — April 13, 1995) was a Canadian ice hockey player who played for 27 games for the New York Americans and Brooklyn Americans in the NHL between 1940 and 1942. The rest of his career, which lasted from 1940 to 1960, was mainly spent in the minor American Hockey League.

Biography
Branigan was born in Winnipeg, Manitoba, and began his career as a defenceman playing with the Winnipeg Monarchs of the Manitoba Junior Hockey League from 1939–1940. In October 1940, he was signed by the New York/Brooklyn Americans of the NHL and played for the team from 1940–1942.

While serving in World War II, he played for the Winnipeg RCAF Bombers. He also played several seasons with the AHL, playing for the Indianapolis Capitols, Hershey Bears and the Providence Reds.

He finished his playing career in the Eastern Hockey League in 1960 playing for the Washington Presidents and the New York Rovers. Branigan also coached the Washington Presidents and the New York Rovers from 1958–1960.

He died on April 13, 1995, in Providence, Rhode Island, and is interred in Swan Point Cemetery in Providence.

Career statistics

Regular season and playoffs

Awards and achievements 
Calder Cup AHL Championships (1947 & 1956)
AHL Second Team All-Star (1956)
Honoured Member of the Manitoba Hockey Hall of Fame

References

External links

1922 births
1995 deaths
Brooklyn Americans players
Canadian expatriate ice hockey players in the United States
Canadian ice hockey defencemen
Hershey Bears players
Indianapolis Capitals players
New York Americans players
New York Rovers players
Providence Reds players
Royal Canadian Air Force personnel of World War II
Ice hockey people from Winnipeg
Springfield Indians players
Washington Presidents players
Winnipeg Monarchs players